Thomas Lyster may refer to:
Thomas Lister (regicide) (1597–1668), or Lyster, colonel in the Parliamentary army during the English Civil War and an MP
 Sir Thomas Lyster (Cavalier) (1612–1655), supported King Charles I during the English Civil War
 Thomas William Lyster (1855–1922), Irish librarian